Aragnouet is a commune in the Hautes-Pyrénées department in southwestern France. It is near with the Spanish border.

Population

Transportation
The Bielsa tunnel under the Pyrenees connects Aragnouet and Bielsa in Spain. It was first opened in 1976. In 2002, the French government unilaterally decided to close the tunnel to heavy-goods vehicles over 3.5 tonnes, a decision which caused serious concern in Aragon.

See also
Communes of the Hautes-Pyrénées department

References

Communes of Hautes-Pyrénées
France–Spain border crossings
World Heritage Sites in France